Nationality words link to articles with information on the nation's poetry or literature (for instance, Irish or France).

Events
1400:
 Sir Gawain and the Green Knight completed (started around 1350)
 Geoffrey Chaucer, The Canterbury Tales, left incomplete with the author's death this year

1402:
 Pere de Queralt appointed ambassador to Tunis

Works published

Births
Death years link to the corresponding "[year] in poetry" article:

1400:
 Olivier Basselin (died 1450), French poet
 Raighu (died 1479), Apabhraṃśa poet

1402:
 Nezahualcoyotl (died 1472), philosopher, poet and ruler (tlatoani) of the city-state of Texcoco in pre-Columbian Mexico

1403:
 Gilbert Hay, or perhaps "Sir Gilbert the Hay", who may have been a different person; last mentioned this year (died 1455), Scottish poet and translator

1404:
 Leon Battista Alberti (born 1472), Italian author, artist, architect, poet, priest, linguist, philosopher, and cryptographer

1405:
 Sir Thomas Malory (died 1471), English writer, and author of Le Morte d'Arthur
 Georges Chastellain born 1405 or 1415 (died 1475), Burgundians chronicler and poet

1408:
 Annamacharya (died 1503), mystic saint composer of the 15th century, widely regarded as the Telugu "pada kavita pitaamaha" (grand old man of simple poetry); husband of Tallapaka Tirumalamma
 Chandidas (died unknown), refers to (possibly more than one) medieval poet of Bengal

1409:
 Liu Jue (died 1472), Chinese landscape painter, calligrapher, and poet

Deaths
Birth years link to the corresponding "[year] in poetry" article:

1400:
 Geoffrey Chaucer (born 1343), English author, poet, philosopher, bureaucrat, courtier and diplomat
 Jan of Jenštejn (born 1348), Archbishop of Prague who was a poet, writer and composer
 Kamal Khujandi (born unknown), Persian(Tajik) Sufi and Persian ghazal poet
 William Langland (born 1332), conjectured author of the 14th-century English dream-vision Piers Plowman
 Franco Sacchetti (born 1335), Italian poet and novelist

1405:
 Gilabert de Próixita (born unknown), Valencian poet with twenty-one extant Occitan pieces
 Jean Froissart (born 1337), French chronicler and poet

See also

 Poetry
 15th century in poetry
 15th century in literature

Notes

15th-century poetry
Poetry